Robert Blackburn (December 17, 1828 – August 12, 1894) was a Scottish-Canadian businessman and politician. Blackburn served as a village reeve and Member of Parliament.

Blackburn was born in Glasgow, Scotland in 1828, the son of Robert Blackburn, and came to Canada in 1842. He became a lumber merchant and partner in woollen mills. He was reeve of Gloucester Township, Ontario in 1864. He was also reeve of New Edinburgh, Ontario from 1868 to 1870 and from 1871 to 1873. In 1864, Blackburn married Mary Ann French. He was Liberal Member of Parliament for Russell from 1874 to 1878. Blackburn also served as a director of the Bank of Ottawa and the Ottawa Agricultural Insurance Company. Along with William Goodhue Perley and others, he helped establish the Ottawa City Passenger Railway Company, a horse-drawn tram service, in 1866. He died in Liverpool, England at the age of 64.

Blackburn Hamlet, Ontario was named after him.

His uncle, James Blackburn, represented the County of Ottawa in the Legislative Assembly of Lower Canada.

References 

1828 births
1894 deaths
Members of the House of Commons of Canada from Ontario
Liberal Party of Canada MPs
Mayors and reeves of Gloucester Township, Ontario
Scottish emigrants to pre-Confederation Ontario
Canadian people of Scottish descent
Immigrants to the Province of Canada